The Thomas C. Ferguson Power Plant consists of dual natural gas fired turbines and a single steam turbine run by exhaust heat from the gas turbines in a combined cycle configuration that generates 540 megawatts (MW) of electricity. The facility is located near Horseshoe Bay in Llano County, Texas, United States.  It is owned and operated by the Lower Colorado River Authority (LCRA) and was named for Thomas C. Ferguson, a member of LCRA's first Board of Directors. Cooling water is provided by Lake LBJ, a freshwater reservoir created by Wirtz Dam.

The LCRA broke ground in April 2012 on the plant to replace the existing single-unit natural gas fired 420 megawatt turbine completed in 1974. Fluor Corporation was the general contractor on the Ferguson Replacement Project. The LCRA dedicated the new $500 million facility, which is 35% more efficient, in October 2014.

During its last years, the original generator only operated during periods of peak demand or when other utilities needed reserve or emergency power. It stopped operating in September 2013 and was dismantled.

See also

 List of power stations in Texas

References

External links 
Lower Colorado River Authority page for the Thomas C. Ferguson Power Plant

Energy infrastructure completed in 2014
Natural gas-fired power stations in Texas
Buildings and structures in Llano County, Texas
Lower Colorado River Authority
2014 establishments in Texas